Moses Ilyich Schönfinkel (29 September 1888 – 1942) was a logician and mathematician, known for the invention of combinatory logic.

Life
Moses Schönfinkel was born in 1888 in Ekaterinoslav, Russian Empire (now Dnipro, Ukraine). Moses Schönfinkel was born to a Jewish family. His father was Ilya Girshevich Schönfinkel, a merchant of first guild, who was in а grocery store trade, and  his mother, Maria “Masha” Gertsovna Schönfinkel (née Lurie) came from a prominent Lurie family. Moses had siblings named Deborah, Natan, Israel and Grigoriy. Schönfinkel attended the Novorossiysk University of Odessa, studying mathematics under Samuil Osipovich Shatunovskii (1859–1929), who worked in geometry and the foundations of mathematics. From 1914 to 1924, Schönfinkel was a member of David Hilbert's group at the University of Göttingen in Germany. On 7 December 1920 he delivered a talk entitled Elemente der Logik ("Elements of Logic") to the group where he outlined the concept of combinatory logic. Heinrich Behmann, a member of Hilbert's group, later revised the text and published it in 1924. In 1928, Schönfinkel had one other paper published, on special cases of the decision problem (Entscheidungsproblem), that was prepared by Paul Bernays.

After he left Göttingen, Schönfinkel returned to Moscow. By 1927 he was reported to be mentally ill and in a sanatorium. His later life was spent in poverty, and he died in Moscow some time in 1942. His papers were burned by his neighbors for heating.

Work
Schönfinkel developed a formal system that avoided the use of bound variables. His system was essentially equivalent to a combinatory logic based upon the combinators B, C, I, K, S and a combinator for a universally quantified nand function which he called U. Schönfinkel stated that the system could be reduced to just K, S, and U (a colleague stated that U could be factored to the end of any expression and thus not always explicitly written) and outlined a proof that a version of this system had the same power as predicate logic.

His paper also showed that functions of two or more arguments could be replaced by functions taking a single argument. This replacement mechanism simplifies work in both combinatory logic and lambda calculus and would later be called currying, after Haskell Curry. While Curry attributed the concept to Schönfinkel, it had already been used by Frege (an example of Stigler's law).

The complete known published output of Schönfinkel consists of just two papers: his 1924 On the Building Blocks of Mathematical Logic, and another, 31-page paper written in 1927 and published 1928, coauthored with Paul Bernays, entitled Zum Entscheidungsproblem der mathematischen Logik (On the Decision Problem of Mathematical Logic).

Publications
  – Translated by Stefan Bauer-Mengelberg as "On the building blocks of mathematical logic" in Jean van Heijenoort, 1967. A Source Book in Mathematical Logic, 1879–1931. Harvard University Press, pp. 355–66.

See also
 Bernays–Schönfinkel class

Further reading
  e. A celebration of the development of combinators, a hundred years after they were introduced by Moses Schönfinkel in 1920.

References

External links
 
  

1888 births
1942 deaths
Mathematicians from the Russian Empire
Scientists from Dnipro
Odesa University alumni
Russian logicians
Ukrainian Jews
Russian people of Ukrainian-Jewish descent
Soviet philosophers
Jewish philosophers
Soviet logicians
Expatriates from the Russian Empire in Germany